The District Councils' Network (DCN) is a special interest group in the Local Government Association. It represents 183 non-metropolitan district councils in England, representing over 40% of the population and 68% of the land. It is funded by membership subscriptions and its purpose is to "act as an informed and representative advocate for districts to government and other national bodies, based on their unique position to deliver for 'local' people".

It shares offices with the Local Government Association in Westminster.

History 

District Councils were created in 1974 following the restructure of local government in England. District Councils were created alongside County Councils and are responsible for running services such as housing, economic development, waste collection, planning and community services.

Following the re-organisation of local government the Association of District Councils (ADC) was set up in April 1974. This replaced the Rural District Councils Association and Urban District Councils Association as the representative body of non-metropolitan district councils in England. In March 1997, the ADC was wound up and merged with other local authority organisations to form the Local Government Association (LGA).

The District Councils’ Network was formed as a special interest group of the LGA to give a distinct voice for District Councils. In 2011, the DCN inherited funds from the defunct ADC.

Members' Board and Chief Executives’ Group 

The DCN has a Members' Board consisting of 22 councillors representing the Conservative, Labour, Liberal Democrats and independent groups from all areas of the country. As of 2021 this is chaired by Cllr Sam Chapman-Allen, Leader of Breckland.

Alongside the DCN Members' Board sits the Chief Executives’ Group (CEG) made up of District Chief Executives from across the country. The chair of the CEG is Bill Cullen, Chief Executive at Hinckley and Bosworth Borough Council.

The Director of the DCN is James Hood.

The DCN Assembly meets four times a year including an annual DCN Conference; previous keynote speakers include Liz Truss, Chief Secretary to the Treasury, James Brokenshire, Secretary of State for Housing, Communities and Local Government and Greg Clark, Secretary of State for Business, Energy and Industrial Strategy.

About 

The DCN provides a voice for district councils to the Local Government Association, Central Government and other national bodies. This work includes informing and influencing national and local stakeholders. The DCN has worked on a variety of issues; including local government finance, welfare reform, planning, housing, economic regeneration and health and wellbeing.

The DCN has released a number of publications on issues affecting district councils in England. In 2015 the DCN commissioned renowned health think-tank The Kings Fund to explore the scope for districts playing a greater preventative role in the public health agenda in a groundbreaking study 'A time of challenge and opportunity'  and academics from the University of Birmingham's Inlogov to investigate the best way districts should adapt to the English devolution agenda  in a report entitled 'Building Better Collaboration'.

Previous publications have included a joint research project with the independent think tank New Local Government Network on new ways of working; a publication on District Councils involvement in City Deals,  and Districts actions on the Public Health agenda.
The DCN also provide evidence on behalf of District Councils to central government to help shape the direction of policy towards local government. This has included evidence on Community Budgets, Local Enterprise Partnerships, Localisation of Council Tax, Business Rates, Public Health, Welfare Reform and Private Rented Sector Housing.
The DCN also host a number of events each year on topics affecting District Councils such as public health and private sector housing.

List of counties and districts 

This is a list of non-metropolitan counties and their districts in membership of the District Councils’ Network.

See also 

Local government in England
History of local government in England
Local government in the United Kingdom
Political make-up of local councils in the United Kingdom#District councils
Local Government Association

References

External links 
 District Councils' Network

Local government in the United Kingdom